Arnold L. Schuster (February 21, 1928 – March 8, 1952) was an American clothing salesman and amateur detective known for his involvement in the capture of bank robber Willie "The Actor" Sutton and for Schuster's subsequent murder by either the Gambino crime family, associates of Sutton, or any one of the many suspects police questioned about his death. He was a distant paternal cousin of literary agent and book publisher M. Lincoln ("Max") Schuster of Simon & Schuster.

Background
A longtime resident of Brooklyn, New York, 24-year-old Schuster recognized wanted bank robber Willie "The Actor" Sutton while travelling on the city subway on February 18, 1952. Following Sutton to a garage, Schuster quickly notified police of his whereabouts. This resulted in the robber's later arrest as Sutton was changing a dead battery from his car, which had stalled in the street.

After receiving a modest amount of publicity from New York City press, Schuster was murdered outside his home on March 8, 1952, having been shot twice in the groin and once in each eye. Although a manhunt was quickly organized by police, their search failed to apprehend any suspects. Eventually, Sutton associate and FBI Ten Most Wanted fugitive Frederick J. Tenuto was suspected of Schuster's murder. Tenuto was positively identified by witnesses as having left the scene of the crime. According to Detective Jack LaTorre, over 300 suspects were questioned, one being a local fence for stolen goods.

Death and aftermath
According to testimony in 1963 by Mafia informant Joseph Valachi, Gambino crime family boss Albert Anastasia allegedly ordered Schuster's murder. When Anastasia saw Schuster being interviewed on television, he allegedly said: "I can't stand squealers! Hit that guy!" However, many people in law enforcement were skeptical. No one was ever arrested in the murder.

Schuster was buried in Montefiore Cemetery in Springfield Gardens, Queens.

Schuster's estate sued New York City for failure to protect him. In accordance with the law at that time, their complaint was dismissed and the dismissal was affirmed by the intermediate appellate court (1955). In general, governments were held not to owe protection obligations to citizens for fear of straining public treasuries (among other reasons). However, in a landmark case, New York's highest court reversed the decisions and ruled that in a case where a member of the public has furnished the sort of cooperation that the police have asked the public for, an obligation of protection of a person who comes forward to help the police is created. Schuster v. City of New York, 5 N.Y.2d 75 (1958). This important precedent meant the case could go to trial. The City of New York eventually settled for $41,000, a reasonably large sum at the time, especially considering that even the presumably exaggerated sum the complaint sought was $1,000,000.

See also
List of unsolved murders

References

External links
New York Sun - Arnold Schuster's Mysterious Death by Gary Shapiro
Arnold Schuster.com Historical web site about the unsolved murder

Sifakis, Carl. The Mafia Encyclopedia. New York: Da Capo Press, 2005. 
Sifakis, Carl. The Encyclopedia of American Crime. New York: Facts on File Inc., 2001. 

1927 births
1952 deaths
20th-century American Jews
American murder victims
Deaths by firearm in Brooklyn
Murdered American Jews
People from Borough Park, Brooklyn
People murdered in New York City
Male murder victims
Unsolved murders in the United States